Shelter from the Storm: A Concert for the Gulf Coast was a one-hour, commercial-free benefit concert television special that aired simulcast worldwide on September 9, 2005, at 8 p.m. ET/CT live (with a 30-second tape delay) from New York City and Los Angeles and tape delayed in the Mountain Time Zone and Pacific Time Zones. The special raised money for the relief efforts from the aftermath of Hurricane Katrina. It was broadcast in over 100 different countries. All proceeds went to the American Red Cross or The Salvation Army.

Production
The concert was a cooperative and collaborative global effort between ABC, CBS, NBC, FOX, UPN, and The WB. Several cable stations have also cleared space for the concert. It featured appearances and musical performances by celebrities from the world of film, television and music. Approximately $30 million was raised for the American Red Cross and The Salvation Army.

The event was produced by Joel Gallen and followed very closely in the footprints of America: A Tribute to Heroes, which raised money for the relief efforts from the aftermath of the September 11 attacks (both telethons had the Los Angeles segments at CBS Television City).  It featured performances by popular musicians along with commentary by various actors and other celebrities.  Celebrities also answered phone calls to help collect donations.

Musical guests and performances

Randy Newman, "Louisiana 1927"
U2 with Mary J. Blige, "One" (recorded earlier that day in Toronto)
Alicia Keys with Alvin Slaughter, Shirley Caesar and Bishop Eric McDaniel: Gospel Medley: "Remember Me", Come by Here, My Lord" and "We Need To Hear From You"
Neil Young, "When God Made Me"
Foo Fighters, "Born on the Bayou"
Mariah Carey, "Fly Like a Bird"
Paul Simon, "Take Me to the Mardi Gras"
unknown New Orleans jazz band, coda
Dixie Chicks with Mike Campbell and Robert Randolph, "I Hope"
Kelly Clarkson, "Shelter"
Sheryl Crow, "The Water Is Wide"
Rod Stewart with Jerry Lawson & Talk of the Town, "People Get Ready"
Kanye West, "Jesus Walks"
Garth Brooks with Trisha Yearwood and Paul Shaffer, "Who'll Stop the Rain"
Dr. John, "Walkin' to New Orleans"

Spoken appearances were made by Bruce Willis, Julia Roberts, Don Cheadle, Jennifer Aniston, Jack Black, Cameron Diaz, Ellen DeGeneres, Morgan Freeman, Jack Nicholson, Chris Rock, Ray Romano, and Sela Ward.

Phones were answered by Ben Affleck, Jason Alexander, Jennifer Aniston, Sean Astin, Angela Bassett, Jack Black, Adrien Brody, Don Cheadle, Michael Chiklis, Ellen DeGeneres, Benicio del Toro, Danny DeVito, Cameron Diaz, Jennifer Garner, Sarah Michelle Gellar, Randy Jackson, Allison Janney, Christine Lahti, Reba McEntire, Mandy Moore, Jack Nicholson, Jeremy Piven, Emily Procter, Dennis Quaid, Julia Roberts, The Rock, Ray Romano, Doug Savant, Jimmy Smits, Mary Steenburgen, Nia Vardalos, Sela Ward, Bruce Willis, Alfre Woodard, and James Woods.

The program was released on DVD by 20th Century Fox on December 6, 2005.

This program is not to be confused with A Concert for Hurricane Relief, which NBC aired by itself the previous Friday night, September 2.  It was on that show that Kanye West commented on President George W. Bush's handling of the disaster.

Broadcast networks

United States

Broadcasters
 ABC
 CBS
 Fox
 I
 NBC
 PBS
 UPN
 The WB

Cable and satellite
 ABC Family
 AmericanLife TV Network
 Black Family Channel
 CNBC
 Court TV
 E!
 Fox College Sports
 Fox Movie Channel
 Fox Reality Channel
 FSN
 Fuel TV
 FX
 G4 Media
 GSN
 Lifetime
 MSNBC
 Ovation TV
 Oxygen
 Showtime
 Sirius Satellite Radio
 SOAPnet
 SPEED Channel
 Style Network
 Superstation WGN
 TBS
 Tennis Channel
 Trio
 TV Guide Network
 TV One
 USA Network
 Wealth TV

Canada
 A Channel
 Bravo!
 CTV
 CBC Television
 Citytv
 Global Television Network

Other foreign
 MediaCorp Channel 5 (Singapore)
 Sky One (United Kingdom)

External links 
 CTV.ca CTV joins plan to air hurricane benefit concert.
 

Hurricane Katrina disaster relief benefit concerts
American telethons
2005 television specials
2005 in American television
2000s American television specials
Music television specials
Simulcasts